Novokulishovka is a rural locality (a settlement) in Novokharkovskoye Rural Settlement, Olkhovatsky District, Voronezh Oblast, Russia. The population was 76 as of 2010.

Geography 
Novokulishovka is located 11 km north of Olkhovatka (the district's administrative centre) by road. Kulishovka is the nearest rural locality.

References 

Rural localities in Olkhovatsky District